Cyardium is a genus of longhorn beetles of the subfamily Lamiinae, containing the following species:

 Cyardium castelnaudii (Thomson, 1864)
 Cyardium cribrosum Pascoe, 1866
 Cyardium granulatum Breuning, 1980
 Cyardium malaccense Breuning, 1968
 Cyardium obscurum Aurivillius, 1925
 Cyardium variegatum Aurivillius, 1913

References

Pteropliini